The Humans may refer to:

The Humans (comic), a comic published as a spiritual successor to the Planet of the Apes series
 The Humans (video game), a 1992 puzzle platforming video game
 The Humans (play), a Tony Award-winning Broadway play
 The Humans (film), an American film adaptation of the play
 The Humans (UK band), a UK/American rock band founded in 2007
 The Humans (New York band), an American 1960s garage rock band
 The Humans (Romanian band), a Romanian pop rock band founded in 2017
The Humans, a 2013 novel by Matt Haig
 Humans (American band), a US new wave band founded in 1979

See also 
 Human (disambiguation)